Real rank may refer to:

 Real rank of a Lie group, the rank of a maximal split torus in the group. 
 Real rank (C*-algebras)